refers to the Japanese belief that mystical powers dwell in words and names. English translations include "soul of language", "spirit of language", "power of language", "power word", "magic word", and "sacred sound". The notion of kotodama presupposes that sounds can magically affect objects, and that ritual word usages can influence our environment, body, mind, and soul.

Basis
This Japanese compound kotodama combines koto 言 "word; speech" and tama 霊 "spirit; soul" (or 魂 "soul; spirit; ghost") voiced as dama in rendaku. This field takes the Japanese gojūon phonology as the mystical basis of words and meanings, in rough analogy to Hebrew Kabbalah.

Etymology
The etymology of kotodama is uncertain, but one explanation correlating words and events links two Japanese words pronounced koto: this  "word; words; speech" and 事 "situation; circumstances; state of affairs; occurrence; event; incident". Kotodama is related with Japanese words such as kotoage  "words raised up; invoke the magical power of words", kotomuke  "directed words; cause submission though the power of words", and jumon  "magic spell; magic words; incantation".

Mythology
Kotodama is a central concept in Japanese mythology, Shinto, and Kokugaku. For example, the Kojiki describes an ukei (or seiyaku)  "covenant; trial by pledge" between the sibling gods Susanoo and Amaterasu, "Let each of us swear, and produce children". Uttering the divine words of the Shinto divination ritual known as ukehi supposedly determines results, and in this case, Amaterasu giving birth to five male deities proved that Susanoo's intentions were pure.

Martial arts
Kototama or kotodama is also fundamental to Japanese martial arts, for instance, in the use of kiai. Morihei Ueshiba, the founder of aikido and a student of Deguchi, used kototama as a spiritual basis for his teachings. William Gleason says Ueshiba "created aikido based on the kototama principle," and quotes him that "Aikido is the superlative way to practice the kototama. It is the means by which one realizes his true nature as a god and finds ultimate freedom." Mutsuro Nakazono, a disciple of Ueshiba, wrote books on the importance of kototama in aikido, such as The Kototama Principle in 1983.

Equivalences
While other cultures have parallels to kotodama, such as mantra, yanling, mana, and logos, some Japanese people believe the "word spirit" is unique to the Japanese language.

See also
 Dōongo / Dōon Igigo (同音語 / 同音異義語, lit. "Like-Sound Utterance" / "Like-Sound Different-Meaning Utterance")—Homophones, while not a-part of Shinto-in-&-of-themselves, occur in many things that are considered lucky are considered-so because they are homophones of things that are lucky (i.e. Jū Nana meaning, both 'great wealth'/'prosperity' and the number #17), and, likewise, many things that are considered unlucky are considered-so because they are homophones of things that are unlucky (i.e. Shizan meaning, both, 'stillborn' and the number #43).  See also Kotodama (below), Imikotoba (below), Tetraphobia, Japanese superstitions and Onomatopoeia.
 Ancient Egyptian conception of the soul#Ren (name)
 Enochian
 Law of contagion
 Magic word
 Mantra
 Names of God
 Norito
 Om
 Om mani padme hum
 Shabda
 Sympathetic magic
 True name

References

External links

Kotodama, Encyclopedia of Shinto
KOTODAMA, Encyclopedia of Aikido
Kotodama: The Power of Words, A Videogame that teaches Japanese, Carnegie Mellon

Japanese mythology
Japanese words and phrases
Language and mysticism
Magic (supernatural)
Shinto
Vitalism